Wright Peak is a small rock Peak located  south of Sutley Peak in the Jones Mountains. It was mapped by the University of Minnesota Jones Mountains Party of 1960–61 which named it for Herb Wright, a glacial geologist from the University of Minnesota and an advisor to the party and visited Antarctica in the 1961–62 season.

Mountains of Ellsworth Land